At least two ships of the French Navy have been named Ferme:

  a  launched in 1763 and sold to the Ottomans in 1774
  a  launched in 1785, renamed Phocion in 1792 and acquired by Spain in 1793

French Navy ship names